St. Patrick is an unincorporated community in Cedar Lake Township, Scott County, Minnesota, United States. 

The community is located along Langford Avenue (Highway 13) at Scott County Road 56 near New Prague and Jordan.

References

Unincorporated communities in Minnesota
Unincorporated communities in Scott County, Minnesota